David Schwimmer is an American actor, comedian, producer, and director.

He gained popularity for his role as Ross Geller in the classic American sitcom Friends (1994-2004). In 1995, Schwimmer received a nomination for the Primetime Emmy Award for Outstanding Supporting Actor in a Comedy Series for his performance. He also received seven Screen Actors Guild Award nominations along with the cast winning in 1995. Schwimmer furthered his career by acting in dramas such as the limited series Band of Brothers (2001) and The People v. O.J. Simpson (2016). For the latter, he was nominated for his second Primetime Emmy Award; this time for Outstanding Supporting Actor in a Limited Series.

Schwimmer has also appeared in fellow Friends co-stars' series such as Matt LeBlanc's Episodes, and Lisa Kudrow's Web Therapy. He has also appeared in various comedy series including 30 Rock, Curb Your Enthusiasm, Will & Grace, and more recently he has been starring in the British sitcom Intelligence (2020).

Major associations

Primetime Emmy Awards

Screen Actors Guild Awards

Miscellaneous awards

American Comedy Awards

Blockbuster Entertainment Awards

British Independent Film Awards

Deauville Film Festival

Gold Derby Awards

Satellite Awards

TV Guide Awards

TV Land Awards

Viewers for Quality Television Awards

References 

Lists of awards received by American actor